The Wemba Wemba language is an extinct Aboriginal Australian language once spoken along the Murray River and its tributaries in North Western Victoria and South Central New South Wales.

Nari Nari, a dialect of Wemba Wemba, is  part of a language revival project. Other dialects are Barababaraba and Wergaia.

Jardwadjali (with dialects Jagwadjali, Nundadjali, Mardidjali) may be Wemba-Wemba, or may be closer to the Madhi–Ladji–Wadi varieties.

Sounds

Consonants

Vowels 

Voiced consonant sounds only occur within prenasalized stops. Prenasal consonants include: /mb/ /nd/ /ndy/ /ng/ and /rnd/. In phonetic form they are pronounced as [mb] [nd] [ɲɟ] [ŋɡ] and [ɳɖ].

Influence on English
At least four botanical terms in Australian English are thought to have been introduced into local speech from Wemba-Wemba:
 dilanj =nitre bush/dillon
 lerep =lerp/honeydew or lerp manna
 gambang = bulrush/cumbungi
 mali =mallee
 The word yabby, a type of crayfish, comes from Wemba-Wemba.

Language revival

, the Nari Nari dialect is one of 20 languages prioritised as part of the Priority Languages Support Project being undertaken by First Languages Australia and funded by the Department of Communications and the Arts. The project aims to "identify and document critically-endangered languages — those languages for which little or no documentation exists, where no recordings have previously been made, but where there are living speakers".

External links 
Wemba Wemba language

References

Kulin languages
Extinct languages of Victoria (Australia)